Common names: ground rattlesnakes, pygmy rattlesnakes, massasaugas

Sistrurus is a genus of venomous pit vipers in the subfamily Crotalinae of the family Viperidae. The genus is endemic to Canada, the United States, and Mexico. Its generic name is a Latinized form of the Greek word for "tail rattler" (Σείστρουρος, seistrouros) and shares its root with the ancient Egyptian musical instrument, the sistrum, a type of rattle. Three species are currently recognized.

Description
Sistrurus species differ from the larger rattlesnakes of the genus Crotalus in a number of ways. They are smaller in size, but also their scalation is different: Sistrurus species have nine large head plates (same as Agkistrodon), whereas in Crotalus (and almost all other viperids), the head is mostly covered with a large number of smaller scales. Sistrurus species have a relatively small rattle that produces more of a high-pitched, buzzing sound than does a larger rattle, like that of Crotalus.

Geographic range
Species of Sistrurus are found in Canada, the Western, Southern, and Midwestern United States, and isolated populations in southern and eastern Mexico.

Venom
Although bites from Sistrurus species are regarded as less dangerous to humans than those from Crotalus rattlesnakes, primarily due to their lower venom yield, every venomous snake bite should be considered serious, and prompt medical treatment should always be sought.

Species

T) Type species.

References

Further reading
Hubbs, Brian; O'Connor, Brendan (2012). A Guide to the Rattlesnakes and other Venomous Serpents of the United States. Tempe, Arizona: Tricolor Books. 129 pp. . (Sistrurus, pp. 72-85).
Powell R, Conant R, Collins JT (2016). Peterson Field Guide to Reptiles and Amphibians of Eastern and Central North America, Fourth Edition. Boston and New York: Houghton Mifflin Harcourt. xiv + 494 pp., 47 plates, 207 figures. . (Sistrurus, pp. 443-445).

External links

 
Reptiles of Mexico
Reptiles of Canada
Reptiles of the United States
Extant Miocene first appearances
Snake genera
Taxa named by Samuel Garman